The Federal Route 8, also known as the Kuala Lumpur–Kota Bharu Highway (Malay: Jalan Kuala Lumpur–Kota Bharu), is a 402.7-km federal highway in Malaysia. It connects Bentong in the south to Kota Bharu in the north. The highway had two parts - Kota Bharu–Kuala Krai Road (Malay: Jalan Kota Bharu–Kuala Krai) and Bentong–Kuala Lipis Road (Malay: Jalan Bentong–Kuala Lipis) until the completion of the missing link from Kuala Krai to Kuala Lipis, causing the entire FT8 highway to take 99 years to be completed.

Route background
The Kilometre Zero of the Federal Route 8 starts at its interchange with the Kuala Lumpur–Karak Expressway E8 (Exit 810) at Bentong, Pahang. Together with the Federal Route 9, it runs along the eastern foothills of the Titiwangsa Range from its southern terminus to Raub. Then, the highways runs further from the Titiwangsa towards Kuala Lipis, and then runs along the western foothills of the Tahan Range towards Kuala Krai. Finally, the Federal Route 8 runs along the eastern bank of the Kelantan River to its northern terminus at Kota Bharu.

The FT8 highway is notorious for its severe traffic congestion, especially along the Kota Bharu–Kuala Krai section. The traffic congestion becomes apparent during festive seasons, with the recorded journey time from Kuala Lumpur to Kota Bharu may exceed 16 hours as of 2014 Hari Raya Aidilfitri festive season.

History
A portion of the Federal Route 8 was a part of the 80-mile Kuala Kubu–Kuala Lipis Road, the earliest trunk road in Pahang, which was constructed by the Public Works Department in 1887. The Kuala Kubu–Kuala Lipis Road connected Kuala Kubu Bharu in Selangor and Kuala Lipis in Pahang. Later, a section from Teranum to Bentong was constructed in 1915. At the same time, the Kota Bharu–Kuala Krai Road was constructed, together with the Kuala Terengganu–Kuantan Road FT3. The original FT8 section from Raub to Bentong via Teranum was later bypassed by a more straight super two highway in 1958 in conjunction of the opening of FELDA Lurah Bilut, causing the old, winding section to be re-gazetted as the Federal Route 218.

However, Bentong–Kuala Lipis Road FT8 and Kota Bharu–Kuala Krai Road FT8 were not extended, creating a 219-km missing link from Kuala Lipis to Kuala Krai. The missing link was only constructed in 1981. The Kuala Krai–Gua Musang Highway FT8 was completed first in August 1983, followed by the Kuala Lipis–Gua Musang Highway FT8 in 1986.

Upgrading into the Central Spine Road
Some parts of the Federal Route 8 can be seen to have constructions which are an upgrading progress of the route. The highway construction can be seen after Merapoh which is at Bukit Tujuh. The highway will take a new route (Central Spine Road) at Chegar Perah thus reducing the accident risks involving animals and sharp corners. Now, some parts of the old route at Chegar Perah had been demolished and motorist have been redirected into the Central Spine Road for a few kilometres before being redirected back to the Federal Route 8 just before Bukit Tujuh (Seven Hills).

Junctions and towns (south–north)

The following is a list of junctions of Route 8, and the towns (in bold with capital letters) that the intersections serve.

References

Highways in Malaysia
008